Oil shale in Morocco represents a significant potential resource. Although Moroccan oil shale has been studied since the 1930s and several pilot plants have extracted shale oil from the local formations, commercial extraction was not underway as of 2011.

Reserves

Morocco's total oil shale resources are estimated to contain  of shale oil.  According to the United States Department of Energy, the oil shale deposits in Morocco constitute about 3.5% of the world's known oil shale resources.  There are ten known oil shale deposits in Morocco.  Most of the local deposits were laid down during the Upper Cretaceous era and are marinites. The most important of these are located at Tarfaya (in the south-westernmost part of Morocco) and Timahdit (in the Middle Atlas Mountains).

The largest known oil shale deposit in Morocco is located at Tarfaya. The deposit is estimated to consist of 80 billion tons of oil shale, containing  of shale oil. The deposit is divided into two flanks on each side of Tazrha sabkha. Its moisture content is about 20% and its sulfur content is about 2%.

Geologically, it comprises two basins: El koubbat and Angueur synclines. The deposit is estimated to consist of 42 billion tons of oil shale, containing  of shale oil. Its moisture content is 6–11% and sulfur content is about 2%. On average it yields  of shale oil per one ton of oil shale. As the Timahdit deposit is located near Ifrane National Park and Haut-Atlas Oriental National Park, oil extraction is an environmentally sensitive issue.

The deposit is estimated to contain  of shale oil. It yields  of shale oil per one ton of oil shale.

History
The Moroccan oil shale industry began with research during the 1930s.  Tanger was the first discovered oil shale deposit.  An 80-tonne-per-day pilot plant extracted shale oil from the formation between 1939 and 1945.  The pilot plant was operated by Société des Schistes Bitumineux de Tanger.

The Timahdit and Tarfaya deposits were discovered during the 1960s.  These deposits were researched and tested during the 1970s and 1980s.  Over 2,200 tons of Timahdit and Tarfaya oil shales were processed in pilot plants in Europe, the United States, Canada, and Japan.  Following these tests, in 1984–1986 the Moroccan Office of Hydrocarbons and Mining (ONHYM) developed and tested a shale oil extraction process called T3. T3 was a surface retorting process, which used two semi-continuous identical retorts. While one retort operated, another retorted cooled after retorting process. The resulting oil yield was 70% of that given by a Fischer Assay, the benchmark test of shale oil extraction potential. Approximately 400 tons of shale oil were produced at Timahdit.

In 1981–1986, Royal Dutch Shell tested the Tarfaya deposit. Shell mined the shale using open pits and extracted its oil in an above-ground retort.

Recent activities
A new strategy and legal framework for oil shale activities was adopted in 2005.  Since 2008, Petrobras and Total S.A. have been evaluating the Timahdit deposit.  In May 2009, San Leon Energy signed a three-year agreement with ONHYM for development of the Tarfaya deposit.  San Leon Energy concluded an exclusive agreement with Mountain West Energy to use the Mountain West Energy-patented In-Situ Vapor Extraction technology for a three-year pilot project at Tarfaya.  In August 2012, San Leon commissioned Enefit Outotec Technology, a joint venture of Eesti Energia and Outotec, to study a feasibility of an Enefit 280 production plant.

Another agreement on Tarfaya deposit was signed with Xtract Energy (Oil Shale) Morocco SA, a joint venture of Global Oil Shale Group Limited (70%) and Alraed Limited Investment Holding Company which is controlled by Bandar bin Mohammed bin Abdulrahman al-Saud.  Eesti Energia had signed an agreement on evaluation of the Aghbala and Errachidia deposits but found these deposits not suitable for commercial production.

References